n-Butyl glycidyl ether is an industrial chemical used in adhesives, sealants, and as a paint or coating additive. It is principally used to reduce the viscosity of epoxy resin systems.

Synthesis
n-Butyl alcohol and epichlorohydrin react in a condensation reaction to form a halohydrin. This is followed by a caustic dehydrochlorination, to form n-butyl glycidyl ether.

Metabolism
n-Butyl glycidyl ether is metabolized renally to butoxyacetic acid, 3-butoxy-2-hydroxypropionic acid and 3-butoxy-2-acetylaminopropionic acid.

Safety
Exposure to n-butyl glycidyl ether through inhalation, eye contact, or skin exposure can cause a cough, sore throat, eye and skin redness, and pain. It is flammable and reacts with strong oxidants, strong bases, strong acids, and amines.

Uses
As an Epoxy modifier it is classed as an epoxy Reactive diluent. It is also used to synthesize other molecules. The use of the diluent does effect mechanical properties and microstructure of epoxy resins. It has been used to simultaneously increase cryogenic strength, ductility and impact resistance of epoxy resins.

References

Further reading 
 
 
 

Glycidyl ethers
Reactive diluents